Charles Anderson Wilkinson  (19 July 1868 – 3 November 1956) was a Reform Party (New Zealand), then Independent Member of Parliament for Egmont, in the North Island. He also served as mayor of Eltham from 1941 to 1947.

Member of Parliament

Wilkinson represented the Egmont electorate in the New Zealand House of Representatives from a 1912 by-election to 1919 (when he retired) and then again between 1928 and 1943.

Wilkinson was a Reform MP between 1912–1919 and an Independent from 1928 to 1943 In 1935 and 1938 he was not opposed by National, and he habitually voted with National. He was briefly involved with the National Party, but after he lost its first leadership vote by one vote against Adam Hamilton, he continued to represent the Egmont electorate as an Independent.

In 1935, he was awarded the King George V Silver Jubilee Medal. In the 1951 New Year Honours, Wilkinson was appointed a Commander of the Order of the British Empire for public services.

References

New Zealand Commanders of the Order of the British Empire
Mayors of places in Taranaki
Reform Party (New Zealand) MPs
Independent MPs of New Zealand
1956 deaths
1868 births
Members of the New Zealand House of Representatives
New Zealand MPs for North Island electorates